Volley Lindemans Aalst (former Asse-Lennik) is a volleyball club based in Aalst, Belgium.

The A squad currently plays in the Liga, the highest level of Belgian men's volleyball. The club has won the league twice.

The team has played several times in the Challenge Cup, formerly known as CEV Cup.

Honours
 Belgian Championship
Winners (2): 1986–87, 1987–88

 Belgian Cup
Winners (4): 1984–85, 1991–92, 1992–93, 2014–15

 Belgian SuperCup
Winners (1): 2015–16

Current squad
Coach:  Johan Devoghel

References

External links
Official site 

Belgian volleyball clubs